Münster is an electoral constituency (German: Wahlkreis) represented in the Bundestag. It elects one member via first-past-the-post voting. Under the current constituency numbering system, it is designated as constituency 129. It is located in northern North Rhine-Westphalia, comprising the city of Münster.

Münster was created for the inaugural 1949 federal election. Since 2021, it has been represented by Maria Klein-Schmeink of the Alliance 90/The Greens.

Geography
Münster is located in northern North Rhine-Westphalia. As of the 2021 federal election, it is coterminous with the independent city of Münster.

History
Münster was created in 1949, then known as Münster-Stadt und -Land. It acquired its current name in the 1965 election. In the 1949 election, it was North Rhine-Westphalia constituency 38 in the numbering system. From 1953 through 1961, it was number 97. From 1965 through 1976, it was number 95. From 1980 through 1998, it was number 99. From 2002 through 2009, it was number 130. Since 2013, it has been number 129.

Originally, the constituency comprised the city of Münster and the Landkreis Münster district. From 1965 through 1976, it comprised the city of Münster and the municipalities of Amelsbüren, Handorf, Hiltrup, and St. Mauritz from the Landkreis Münster district. Since the 1980 election, it has been coterminous with the city of Münster.

Members
The constituency has been held by the Christian Democratic Union (CDU) during all but two Bundestag terms since 1949. It was first represented by Peter Nellen of the CDU from 1949 to 1961, followed by Hermann Diebäcker for two terms and Franz Berding for one. Friedrich-Adolf Jahn was then representative from 1972 to 1994. He was succeeded by Ruprecht Polenz from 1994 to 2002. Christoph Strässer of the Social Democratic Party (SPD) was elected in 2002 and re-elected in 2005, but former member Polenz regained the constituency for the CDU in 2009. Sybille Benning was elected in 2013 and re-elected in 2017. Maria Klein-Schmeink was elected for the Greens in 2021.

Election results

2021 election

2017 election

2013 election

2009 election

References

Federal electoral districts in North Rhine-Westphalia
1949 establishments in West Germany
Constituencies established in 1949
Münster